Groove High is a musical-comedy television series which aired on Disney Channel from November 2012 to March 2013. A mixture of live action and animation, the series centers around touring rock pop stars Tom played by Jonathan Bailey and Zoe played by Samantha Barks as they reminisce their time at their performing arts high school Groove High.

Premise
Each show begins in live action whereby Tom Mason (Jonathan Bailey) and Zoe Myer (Samantha Barks) are two rock pop stars touring with their band. Between shows they like to remember the good old days at their performing arts high school Groove High. As they remember key events the show presents their memories as animated flashbacks. Their memories are often slightly distorted or exaggerated and Tom and Zoe's live action counterparts frequently interrupt the flashbacks to disagree about how it really happened.

Production
Groove High is co-produced by French company Planet Nemo, Irish company Telegael Teoranta and Belgian company Nexus Factory, which co-own copyright to the series. Voice recording work for the animated sections began in April 2010, with live action filming completed at Telegael Teoranta in Ireland in October 2011. Animation was completed by Chinese company Jetoon Animation and Filipino company Philippine Animators Group Inc., who also co-produced the series, which also co-own copyright to it. All music in the show including the theme song  were originally written arranged and recorded by Belgian composers Eric Renwart and Marja Supponen, then sung by lead actors Bailey and Barks.

After the show ended, Bailey and Barks worked together again for the musical The Last Five Years at The Other Place in London, in 2016.

Cast

Main 
 Jonathan Bailey as Tom Mason
 Samantha Barks as Zoe Myer

Supporting 

 Beth Chalmers as Coco
 Rupert Degas as Duke
 Rasmus Hardiker as Baz
 Rebekah Staton as Vic

Broadcast
The series aired on Disney Channel in the UK, France, Portugal, Italy, Spain, Australia, and New Zealand. It also aired on Kids Central in the United States, Teletoon+ in Poland, BBC Kids in Canada, Nickelodeon in the Benelux, Germany and Scandinavia, Arutz HaYeladim in Israel, PBS in Malta, TG4 in Ireland,  Televisa in Latin America, YLE in Finland, TV5 Monde in France, MBC 3 in the Middle East and E-Junior in the United Arab Emirates.

Episodes

References

External links
 

Disney Channel original programming
2010s British animated television series
2010s British comedy television series
2010s high school television series
2012 British television series debuts
2013 British television series endings
British high school television series
British musical television series
British television series with live action and animation
Television series about fictional musicians